Budaun is commonly pronounced Badayun is a city and a seat of Budaun district, Uttar Pradesh, India. It is located near the Ganges river in the centre of Western Uttar Pradesh. Budaun was the capital of Delhi Sultanate for four years from 1210 CE to 1214 CE during Sultan Iltutmish rule. It was the most important post of Northern Frontier during Mughal reign. Budaun is a big market, historically famous and religiously important city. It is the heart of Rohilkhand. Budaun is 229 km from New Delhi and it takes about 5 to 7 hours to reach the city depending on mode of transport i.e. car or roadways bus service. The town is near the left bank of the river Sot.

Etymology and archaeology 
Prof. Goti John referred this city was named Bedamooth in an ancient inscription based on stone scripts at the Lucknow Museum. Later this region was called Panchal. According to the lines on stone scripts there was a village Bhadaunlak near the city. The Muslim historian Roz Khan Lodhi said that at Ashoka The Great built a Buddh Vihar and Quila; he named it BuddhMau (Budaun Fort). According to George Smith, Budaun was named after the Ahir prince Budh.

Recent Archaeology-  Though it is an ancient as well as archaeological-rich city yet it do not get much more importance in terms of archaeology. Recently, in a village in Budaun known as Kheda Jalalpur village.  

Fragments of Hindu temple idols, ancient bricks have been recovered from the mound of that village. According to the ASI, these remains belong to the post-Gupta period (7th-8th century), which is related to the time of about 1300-1400 years before today.

History
According to the (Budaun District, Govt. Of Uttar Pradesh) stories, Budaun was named after Ahir prince Budh. The local tradition regarding this city is that it was founded in 905 A.D. by an Ahir prince whose name was Budh. and after whom it was called Budaun. and an inscription, probably of the 12th century, gives a list of twelve Rathore kings reigning at Budaun then called Vodamāyuta. Kanauj was conquered after 1085 by Mahmūd, the son of the Ghaznavid Sultān, driving out the Rāshtrakūta chief. This the Rāshtrakūta chief then move their capital to Vodamāyuta, where they ruled until conquered by Qutb-ud-din Aibak.

The first authentic historical event connected with it, however, was its capture by Qutb-ud-din Aibak in 1196, after which it became a very important post on the northern frontier of the Delhi empire. In 1223, a mosque of imposing size, crowned with a dome, was built. In the 13th century two of its governors, Shams-ud-din Iltutmish, the builder of the mosque referred above, and his son Rukn ud din Firuz, attained the imperial throne. In 1571 the town was burnt, and about a hundred years later, under Shah Jahan, the seat of the governorship was transferred to Sahaspur-Bilari. Budaun and its district was ceded to the British government in 1801 by the Nawab of Oudh.

In 1911, Budaun was a town and district of British India, in the Rohilkhand division of the United Provinces. At the time, an American Methodist mission maintained several girls schools and there was a high school for boys.

Politics
Sanghmitra Maurya is the MP of the Budaun Constituency and is the daughter of Swami Prasad Maurya. Budaun has large population of Ahirs which according to British historian Matthew Atmore Sherring came from Hansi and Hisar which is in Haryana.

Demographics

 census, Budaun City had a population of 159,221 (83,475 male 75,746 female = 1000/907), 39,613 (12.3%) of whom were aged 0–6. The adult literacy rate was 73.%. The widely spoken language in the city is Hindi and Awadhi.  The sex ratio of Budaun city is 907 per 1000 males. Child sex ratio of girls is 882 per 1000 boys. The area of the city is 81 square km. Budaun Metro Area have a population of around 417000 and an area of  With Badaun City, it includes Shekhupur, Bahedi, Islamganj, Chandanpur, Salarpur, Salarpur Industrial Estate, Shekhupur Firing Range, Padauna and Khera Buzurg.%.

Tourism
Budaun is considered to be of immense religious significance among both Hindus and Muslims. At the first glance,  with its dusty avenues and sleepy streets, it seems nothing more than a secluded small town. But there are numerous ruins and monuments that reveal many legends from its past. Casting a nostalgic charm, Budaun transports visitors to an era of mighty rulers and mystic Sufi saints like Nizamuddin Auliya - a Sufi saint. Adding to its allure is an aura of spirituality throughout the town. Budaun is home to a number of ruins that can be traced back to the Mughal era. The Budaun Fort and the iconic clock tower Ghanta Ghar, are among the prominent attractions, as are the tombs of rulers such as Iltumish and Ala Ud Din Alam Shah, who was the last ruler of the Sayyid dynasty. The 13th century Jama Masjid, which was built by Iltumish and the Qadri Dargah are among the popular shrines in Budaun. Budaun also hosts the ancient Gauri Shankar Temple dedicated to Hindu God Shiva, it is India's first Rasling a Shivling made by amalgamation of liquid Mercury and.Gold.

Distance
Bareilly - 51 km via NH530b
Delhi - 234 km via SH 18 and Eastern Peripheral Expressway
Mathura - 165 km via NH 530b
Agra - 172 km via NH21
Kanpur - 253 km via SH 43
Meerut - 215 km via SH18
Muzaffarnagar - 270 km via SH18

Notable people

See also
 Badayuni
 Panchala
 Sotha
 Shyam Nagar
 Civil Lines, Budaun
 Great Mosque, Budaun

References

 
Populated places established in the 10th century
Rohilkhand
Cities in Uttar Pradesh
Former capital cities in India